Mansour Bushnaf (born October 22, 1954)
is a Libyan writer. He began his literary career as a playwright and essayist, before writing his debut novel Chewing Gum (novel) which was banned in 2008 in Libya Bushnaf’s essays have appeared in the Al-Hayat, Al-Quds Al-Arabi, Al-Arab and Al-Wasat. The English translation of his novel, Chewing Gum (novel), was published in 2014. He currently lives and writes in Tripoli.

Background
Mansour Bushnaf was born in Bani Walid, a small town, south-east of the Libyan capital Tripoli. He studied in Bani Walid and Misrata, where he began writing and dramatising plays for his school drama club.

He began writing his essays in Libyan newspapers in the 1970s as a university student, when he was detained in 1976 by Gaddafi regime and spent 12 years in prison with other Libyan writers and intellectuals. After his release in 1988 Bushnaf wrote several plays that were produced to wide acclaim in Libya.

Literary career 
Bushnaf wrote several plays, which were performed in Libyan theatres. his first novel, The Night Mirage.. Chewing Gum, was published in Arabic in early 2008, by an independent publisher in Cairo but it was soon banned by Libyan authorities from being distributed inside the country. The novel was published in June 2014 by independent publisher DARF Publishers in London with a translation by Mona Zaki.

Bibliography 
 Chewing Gum (novel), DARF Publishers, 2014,

See also
 Arabic literature
 Libyan literature

References

External links
 Mansour Bushnaf on 'killing books' in Libya (interview), BBC News Africa, April 15, 2014
 Winstonsdad's Review of Mansour Bushanf's Chewing Gum, Winstonsdad's Blog, May 19, 2014
 Bookshy Review of Mansour Bushnaf's Chewing Gum, Bookshy An African Book Lover blog, July 3, 2014
 Nahla Ink Review of Mansour Bushnaf's Chewing Gum, Nahla Ink Blog, July 15, 2014
 Ramblings of an Elfpire Review of Chewing Gum By Mansour Bushnaf, Ramblings of an Elfpire, September 30, 2014
 By the Book Reviews on Chewing Gum by Mansour Bushnaf, By the Book Reviews, November 1, 2014

Libyan novelists
Living people
Libyan writers
People from Tripoli, Libya
1954 births
20th-century Libyan writers